(Up A) Lazy River is a 1930 song by Hoagy Carmichael and Sidney Arodin.

Lazy River may also refer to:

 Lazy river, an water park ride
 Lazy River (film), a 1934 American film directed by George B. Seitz

See also
 
 Lazy Branch
 Lazu River (disambiguation)